Heemstedestraat is an Amsterdam Metro station in the west of Amsterdam, Netherlands. The station opened in 1997 and is served by line 50 (Isolatorweg - Gein) and line 51 (Isolatorweg - Central Station).

The station lies in the south of the city and serves as the metro station for many offices, including the World Fashion Centre.

Metro services
50 Isolatorweg - Sloterdijk - Lelylaan - Zuid - RAI - Duivendrecht - Bijlmer ArenA - Holendrecht - Gein
51 Isolatorweg - Sloterdijk - Lelylaan - Zuid - RAI - Amsterdam Amstel - Central Station

Tram services
2 Centraal Station - Leidseplein - Museumplein - Willemsparkweg - Hoofddorpplein - Heemstedestraat - Sloten - Nieuw-Sloten

References

External links
GVB website 

Amsterdam Metro stations
Railway stations opened in 1997